Tell Him may refer to:

"Tell Him" (Barbra Streisand and Celine Dion song), 1997
"Tell Him" (Bert Berns song), a 1962 single by The Exciters, written by Bert Berns
"Tell Him" (Carlton Black song), a 1963 song written by Carlton Black and recorded by several artists
"Tell Him", a song by Shayne Ward from the album Breathless
"Tell Him", a hidden track on the 1998 album The Miseducation of Lauryn Hill by Lauryn Hill
"Loyal to Me", a song by Nina Nesbitt whose chorus begins "Tell him, tell him, tell him/I got somewhere else to be."

See also
Tell Her (disambiguation)